The Meditations are a reggae vocal harmony group from Jamaica formed in late 1974. They have released several studio albums and are still performing in the 2000s and today.

History
The Meditations were formed in late 1974, when Danny Clarke left The Righteous Flames, recruiting Ansel Cridland (previously of The Linkers) and Winston Watson.  After releasing singles credited to the individual members, they began recording as The Meditations in late 1976, shortly after which they released their biggest hit, "Woman Is Like a Shadow", which sold over 45,000 copies in its first month of release. They recorded in the mid-1970s for producers such as Dobby Dobson, Joseph Hoo Kim, and Lee "Scratch" Perry, their righteously Rastafarian style gaining comparisons with The Mighty Diamonds. Their first album, Message From The Meditations, was released in 1977. Robert Christgau called it "a nice one" in Christgau's Record Guide (1981), highlighting the "island chauvinism" of songs like "Running from Jamaica", which "gets on those who emigrate to Canada, Britain, the States, and Africa".

The Meditations sang backing vocals on a number of Bob Marley songs, including "Blackman Redemption", "Punky Reggae Party", and "Rastaman Live Up", as well as providing backing for Gregory Isaacs, Jimmy Cliff and The Congos (on their Heart of the Congos album).

They appeared at the One Love Peace Concert in April 1978, officially a commemoration of the 12th anniversary of Haile Selassie's state visit to Jamaica, but more famous for the handshake between Michael Manley and Edward Seaga when they joined Bob Marley on stage.

The Meditations 1983 album, No More Friend was produced by Linval Thompson and featured The Roots Radics, and saw them adapting to the prevailing early dancehall sound of the time. 

Cridland left the group, leaving Clarke and Watson to record 1988's For The Good of Man without him, but they were reunited for 1993's Return of The Meditations.
All three members by this time were based in the US - Clarke in Phoenix, Arizona, Watson in Seattle, Washington, and Cridland in New York City.

They have subsequently toured the United States and Europe. In 2015, they released the album Jah Always Find a Way, which featured Sly Dunbar (drums), Lloyd Parks (bass), Ansel Collins and Sidney Mills (keyboards), Dwight Pinkney and Willie Lindo (guitars), and Derrick Barnett (bass). As of 2011, the group's official lineup consists of Cridland, Laury Webb, and Daddy Lion Chandell.

Discography

Albums
Message From The Meditations (1977) Wild Flower (JA) / United Artists (UK & US)
Wake Up (1978) Third World (UK) / Double-D (US/JA)
Guidance (1979) Tad's/Guidance
No More Friend (1983) Thompson Sound/Greensleeves
For The Good of Man (1988) Greensleeves
Return of The Meditations (1993) Sonic Sounds/Heartbeat
Ghetto Knowledge (1999) Easy Star
I Love Jah (2002) Wackies (recorded 1982)
Stand In Love (2004) Meditations Music (US)
Jah Always Find a Way (2015) Meditations Music (US)

Compilations
Greatest Hits (1984) Shanachie (US) / Greensleeves (UK)
Deeper Roots: The Best of The Meditations (1994) Heartbeat
Reggae Crazy: Anthology 1971-1979 (1997) Nighthawk

Collaborations
10 Ft Ganja Plant -album: Bass Chalice -song: To Each (2005) ROIR

References

External links
The Meditations at Roots Archives
The Meditations at Rootsdub

Jamaican reggae musical groups
Easy Star Records artists
Greensleeves Records artists
Heartbeat Records artists